The Jet Aircraft Museum is a charitable foundation aviation museum specializing in Canadian Forces jet aircraft. The museum is located at the London International Airport, Ontario, Canada.

The museum officially opened on 12 September 2009.

Mission
The museum states its mission as:

The museum has indicated its intention "JAM will strive to maintain four or more of each type as flying aircraft with a flight of four  reflecting authentic Canadian Forces paint schemes." The museum has listed the CF-100 Canuck, Canadair Sabre, F2H-3 Banshee, CF-101 Voodoo, CF-104 Starfighter, CF-5 Freedom Fighter and CT-114 Tutor as being targets for intended acquisition.

Aircraft 
The aircraft owned by the museum are:

BAC Jet Provost - 1
Canadair CT-133 Silver Star - 6 ex-Canadian Forces aircraft, acquired from Crown Assets Distribution in 2008
McDonnell CF-101 Voodoo - 1
Hawker Hunter - 1

In January 2019 the museum was engaged in raising funds to buy a Canadair CT-114 Tutor for restoration.

See also
List of aerospace museums

References

External links 

 
 Museum T-33 photo
 C-FRGA "Mako Shark"

Aviation history of Canada
Aerospace museums in Ontario
Military and war museums in Canada
Museums in London, Ontario